Michal Shuldenfrei (or Michał Szuldenfrei) (January 27, 1887 in Częstochowa – July 1, 1965) was a Polish Jewish politician, lawyer, a delegate to the first Sejm of post World War II Poland.

He was elected as the only member of the Jewish Bund to the 1947 Polish parliament (as part of the electoral list of the still independent Polish Socialist Party, which was soon forced to merge into the Communist Polish United Workers' Party).

In the interwar period in Poland he served as a defense lawyer in several politically charged trials. He was also very active in the Bund. During the last stages of the German occupation of Poland he joined the Soviet sponsored State National Council. In 1944, after the entry of the Soviet Army into Poland, and the establishment of the Lublin Committee he tried to reorganize the Bund, despite the fact that its pre war leaders, like Victor Alter and Henryk Ehrlich had been executed on Stalin's orders. He was one of the signatories of PKWN's July Manifesto.

After the war he was known for his dedication to the pursuit of German Nazi war criminals responsible for the Holocaust. He was also very active in trying to bring the perpetrators of the Kraków pogrom to justice.

He is buried at the Okopowa Street Jewish Cemetery in Warsaw.

References

1887 births
1965 deaths
People from Częstochowa
People from Piotrków Governorate
General Jewish Labour Bund in Poland politicians
Polish Socialist Party politicians
Polish United Workers' Party members
Members of the State National Council
Members of the Polish Sejm 1947–1952
Commanders of the Order of Polonia Restituta
Officers of the Order of Polonia Restituta
Recipients of the Order of the Banner of Work
Recipients of the Gold Cross of Merit (Poland)